Ormond Lower (Irish: Urumhain Íochtarach) is a barony in County Tipperary, Ireland. This geographical unit of land is one of 12 baronies in County Tipperary. Its chief town is Nenagh. The barony lies between Ormond Upper to the south-east (whose chief town is Toomevara) and Owney and Arra to the south-west (whose chief town is Newport). As a "peninsula", it is surrounded on three sides by counties Galway and Offaly.

Legal context
Baronies were created after the Norman invasion of Ireland as divisions of counties and were used the administration of justice and the raising of revenue. While baronies continue to be officially defined units, they have been administratively obsolete since 1898. However, they continue to be used in land registration and in specification, such as in planning permissions. In many cases, a barony corresponds to an earlier Gaelic túath which had submitted to the Crown. The Earl of Ormond wrongly applied the name "Ormond" to two baronies as they were never part of the eastern Kingdom of Ormond; rather they were part of the tuath of Muskerry Tire which was subject to the north-western Kingdom of Thomond.

Modern times
When County Tipperary was split into North and South Ridings in 1836, Ormond Lower was allocated to the north riding. However, the neighbouring barony of Kilnamanagh was split into Upper and Lower half-baronies, being allocated to the north and south ridings respectively.

Towns, villages and townlands of the barony

Civil parishes
This table lists an historical geographical sub-division of the barony known as the civil parish (not to be confused with an Ecclesiastical parish).

Other villages and townlands
Abbeville, Ballysteena, Ballyquirk, Borrisokane, Cloughjordan (town), Cloghjordanpark (townland), Cowbawn, Crotta, Derry, Drumnamahane Island, Eminiska, Feigh West, Firgrove, Graigue, Islandwood, Johnstown, Killeen, Kilruane, Lehinch, Lorrha, Loughkeen, Modreeny, Mulinkeagh, Newtown, Newtown (Guest), Newtown (Hodgins), O’Meara’s Acres, Oxpark, Portland, Quakerstown, Richmond, Stoneyacre,  Townfields, Uskane, Willsborough.

See also
 List of civil parishes of County Tipperary

External links
  Source given is "Ordnance survey".

References

Baronies of North Tipperary